Phoolpur Pawai is a constituency of the Uttar Pradesh Legislative Assembly covering the city of Phoolpur Pawai in the Azamgarh district of Uttar Pradesh, India.

Phoolpur Pawai is one of five assembly constituencies in the Lalganj Lok Sabha constituency. Since 2008, this assembly constituency is numbered 349 amongst 403 constituencies.

Election results

2022

2017
Bharatiya Janta Party candidate Arun Kumar Yadav won in last Assembly election of 2017 Uttar Pradesh Legislative Elections defeating Bahujan Samaj Party candidate Abul Qais Azmi by a margin of 7,295 votes.

Members of Legislative Assembly

References

External links
 

Assembly constituencies of Uttar Pradesh
Politics of Azamgarh district